The men's circle sepak takraw competition at the 2002 Asian Games in Busan was held from 30 September to 1 October at the Minseok Sports Center in Dongseo University.

Schedule
All times are Korea Standard Time (UTC+09:00)

Squads

Results

Preliminary round

Semifinals

Group 1

Group 2

Final

References 

Official Website
2002 Asian Games Official Report, Page 590

Sepak takraw at the 2002 Asian Games